The following is a list of most watched television broadcasts in Canada based on average viewership of the broadcasts. In recent years, the Super Bowl has frequently been the most watched television broadcast of the year in Canada. The most watched television broadcast in Canadian history was the gold medal game of the men's hockey tournament at the 2010 Winter Olympics, played between the United States and Canada in Vancouver, with an average minute audience of 16.6 million Canadians watching the  game, roughly one-half of Canada's entire population in 2010.

Criteria for inclusion
The lists below include programs that were broadcast in Canada, regardless of their country of origin. Where applicable, these lists also factor in Simultaneous substitution of American programs airing on Canadian networks (such as The Big Bang Theory on CTV). These lists also aggregate the English and French language broadcasts of sports programming (such as Super Bowl LIV on CTV, TSN, RDS). 

These lists do not combine the viewership of major events that have been individually covered by multiple Canadian broadcasters simultaneously (such as the September 11th attacks). Where applicable, sporting event pre-game and post-game shows (as identified in Numeris data) are also excluded entirely, as they benefit from the strong lead-in or lead-out of the live sports broadcast, and otherwise would not be aired. Reruns are also not included, and are considered separate airings of the same program. 

The viewership figures listed are based on live plus seven day average minute audience data from Numeris (which includes DVR viewing up to seven days after broadcast). Peak audience and total reach figures are not listed. Since 2022, Numeris has limited public access to its data,  where available, additional publicly accessible sources may be listed for individual broadcasts. The viewership figures listed on these publicly available sources may differ slightly from the viewership listed here, as not all public disclosures of viewership data include French language simulcasts, not all are based on the final published live plus seven day averages, and some may only include preliminary data based on one day of viewing and instead of seven.

Legend

Most watched broadcasts
The following is a list of the twenty most watched television broadcasts in Canada by average minute audience from at least 2002-2022, with primary audience measurement according to Numeris. 

Eight of the twenty most watched broadcasts took place during the 2010 Winter Olympics which were hosted by the Canadian city of Vancouver. During these Olympics, a new consortium was formed by some of Canada's major private broadcasting companies to simulcast many Olympic events. As such, many of the top twenty broadcasts listed below aired on multiple participating networks of the Olympic consortium, which is referred to as the National Olympic Network on Numeris ratings reports.

Most watched television broadcasts by year

Each list below contains the top ten most watched television broadcasts in Canada within a calendar year, according to Numeris live plus seven day average minute audience measurement figures 
(which includes DVR viewing up to seven days after broadcast).

2022
The following is a list of the most watched television broadcasts of 2022.

2021
The following is a list of the most watched television broadcasts of 2021.

2020

The following is a list of the most watched television broadcasts of 2020.

2019

The following is a list of the most watched television broadcasts of 2019.

1CTV & Citytv simultaneously substituted ABC's coverage of the games, while TSN, Sportsnet, and RDS aired the Canadian produced broadcasts.

2018
The following is a list of the most watched television broadcasts of 2018.

2017
The following is a list of the most watched television broadcasts of 2017.

2016
The following is a list of the most watched television broadcasts of 2016.

2015 
The following is a list of the ten most watched television broadcasts of 2015.

1RDS joined the broadcast in-progress at 9:45 PM.

2014
The following is a list of the ten most watched television broadcasts of 2014.

2013
The following is a list of the ten most watched television broadcasts of 2013.

2012
The following is a list of the ten most watched television broadcasts of 2012.

2011
The following is a list of the ten most watched television broadcasts of 2011.

2010
The Canadian city of Vancouver hosted the 2010 Winter Olympics, which was highly watched among Canadians on the participating networks of Canada's Olympic Broadcast Media Consortium. The consortium was formed specifically for the 2010 and 2012 Olympic Games, with primary coverage appearing on CTV and V, in English and French respectively. Many of the top broadcasts in Canadian history occurred during these Olympics, as such the top broadcasts from 2010 are broken down into three lists: overall, Olympics, and non-Olympics.

Top 10 most watched television broadcasts of 2010

Top 10 most watched television broadcasts of the 2010 Winter Olympics

Top 10 most watched television broadcasts of 2010, excluding broadcasts from the 2010 Winter Olympics

2009 & Earlier

Notes

References

Canadian television-related lists